Meloan, Cummins & Co., General Store, also known as Meloan & Guy and A.J. Forgey Department Stores, is a historic general store located at Paynesville, Pike County, Missouri.  It was built between about 1857 and 1865, and is a two-story, brick commercial  / residential building with Federal / Greek Revival style design elements.  It sits on a stone foundation and has a front gable roof. It has a two-story, two bay, brick addition with a stepped parapet.

It was listed on the National Register of Historic Places in 1993.

References

Commercial buildings on the National Register of Historic Places in Missouri
Greek Revival architecture in Missouri
Federal architecture in Missouri
Commercial buildings completed in 1865
Buildings and structures in Pike County, Missouri
National Register of Historic Places in Pike County, Missouri